Cena Parish is an administrative unit of Jelgava Municipality in the Semigallia region of Latvia. From 2009 until 2021, it was part of the former Ozolnieki Municipality.

References 

Parishes of Latvia
Jelgava Municipality
Semigallia